is a Japanese anime television series produced by Zuiyo Enterprise and animated by Tokyo Movie until episode 26 and by Mushi Production after episode 27. The series is loosely based on the Moomin books by the Finnish author Tove Jansson and was broadcast on Fuji Television from 1969 to 1970. A sequel series entitled Shin Muumin (New Moomin) was later released in 1972.

Jansson never approved of the series or its successor, due to their dramatic changes with the plots, overall atmosphere, and character personalities. Because of this, the series was never translated into any languages or released outside Japan except Taiwan and some others like United Kingdom. Also, the series has never been released in principle since 1990 including in Japan, when a new anime television series Moomin was released with the full involvement of Jansson herself.

The anime series is also the second entry in what is now known as World Masterpiece Theater (Calpis Comic Theater at the time). Zuiyo Enterprise, would split in 1975 into Nippon Animation Company, Ltd. (which employed some of the Zuiyo's production staff and continued with the World Masterpiece Theater franchise) and Zuiyo Company, Ltd.

Summary 

The anime series is notably different from the later anime television series Moomin, released in the early 1990s, which was translated into many languages,released in dozens of countries, and relies more on the original Moomin books and comic strips.

While the series itself was well-liked by the Japanese public as an adventurous and comedic series for boys, it was dramatically different in areas like the adaptation and overall atmosphere.  For example, Moomintroll was portrayed more as an ordinary boy; while still friendly like in the books, he is somewhat ill-tempered, occasionally fighting or behaving slyly. This, along with elements such as Snork being a driver, common use of firearms, one scene in an early episode featuring characters getting drunk together at a bar, and the Snork Maiden's name being translated into Non-Non (ノンノン), infuriated Jansson.

After Tokyo Movie's contract was cancelled, With Mushi Production taking over, the designs were changed accordingly and the series had many more faithful episodes, which included the source's stories and points of mystery, horror, comedy and tragedy. Despite this, Jansson's consent was still not obtained and the program was ended after well over 60 episodes.

Since 1990, Moomin Characters, Ltd, which manages the Moomin copyrights, has not released this series to the public in principle.

Episode 1 of this series is introduced on the company's official website, but this was illegally uploaded to YouTube without Tokyo Movie's consent, and the link is displayed on the website.

Production 
In the 1960s, sports dramas and slapstick comedies were the mainstream of Japanese TV animation at that time. Therefore, Calpis Co., Ltd., the sponsor of the animated program in Fuji TV, wanted to offer a family-oriented animation that was distinctly different from those fields. At that time, "Moomin," which had just been imported from abroad as children's literature, caught their attention. And so the project was launched.

A short time later, the proposal was sent to Tove Jansson. Jansson's response was positive, so Shigeto Takahashi, a producer at Zuiyo Enterprise who was in charge of the project, decided to meet directly with Jansson to proceed with negotiations. Jansson suggested the following conditions for the production of the animation.

No money, no machines, and no television.

Development and pre-production 
Tokyo Movie, now TMS Entertainment, was chosen to produce the animation.

The director was chosen to be Masaaki Osumi, who has the unique background of having come from a puppet theater company. Osumi, who knows Moomin well, initially thought the content was too static to be suitable for animation, but accepted the position.

The company hired Yasuo Otsuka as the animation director. He was considered to be one of Japan's foremost animators, and he was an important mentor to Hayao Miyazaki. He thought the cuteness of movement and the roundness of his drawings as important, and never used straight lines to draw characters such as the Moomins.

The initial meetings were confusing. Takahashi, who respected Jansson's opinions and aimed for a plot that was faithful to the original work, was at odds with the advertising agency, which aimed for a plot that did not respect Jansson's original work on the grounds that "the style as it is will not be popular in Japan". When Osumi attended a meeting invited by the advertising agency, he felt that the meeting was amazingly stupy, because comments such as "Let's run a bullet train in the Moomin Valley". He thought about quitting the job, but, he was fascinated by the animation shown by Mr. Otsuka just before leaving company, and he broke off that thought. Osumi later said of the participants in this meeting, "Perhaps, but they had not even read the original work and were only thinking about the character business.". Later, the bullet train idea was rejected due to opposition from Osumi and others.

In making the animation, Osumi decided to base it on Moomin comic strips rather than a novel by Jansson. It had a freer plot than the novel, and he thought that "the style of the comic would work as an animation. Therefore, Osumi claims that he did not create a plot that was different than that comic.

Hisashi Inoue, a distinguished novelist and dramatist, participated as a screenwriter.

Thus was created "Moomin," a children's animation mixing fantasy by Jansson and Japanese culture.

Change of production company 
When the broadcast began, Tokyo Movie and Zuiyo Enterprise asked Jansson to watch episode 5. This was to get her endorsement. But, she gave the episode a low rating and submitted a letter to the staff with a series of complaints and requests. Tokyo Movie ended production after episode 26 and exited the project because of this letter from Jansson.

But this reason was ostensible. The Moomin project was initially intended to be a low-budget production, but the animators and staff on site insisted on producing high-quality work, and as a result, the budget was far exceeded. Also, Due to its popularity with viewers, the number of broadcasts was suddenly increased from the planned number, but Tokyo movie could not cope with this. For this reason, Tokyo movie's upper management wanted to withdraw from the project and used Jansson's claims as an excuse to Zuiyo Enterprise, the sponsors, and the Fuji TV, who were willing to continue the program.

With the departure of Tokyo Movie from the project, Osumi and other key staff and animators were also dropped from the production. The animators on site were summoned by the president and informed of the sudden termination. They were disappointed, but also relieved. Yutaka Fujioka, who was in charge of the site and wanted the project to continue, was on a business trip that day and was angry when he heard the news of the termination the next day. However, the CEO had already made that decision, and it was too late. They were soon transferred to the Lupin the 3rd Part I: The Classic Adventures project.

Mushi Production became the animation production company from episode 27.

Episode 27 was greatly innovated and changed in response to Jansson's request, with the character design being adapted to drawings by Jansson and the plot of the story being changed as well. Unfortunately, however, after the program ended, the TV station was inundated with many complaints. The children wrote such comments as, "The characters' faces suddenly changed and became scary," and "Why did the atmosphere of the story change and it became boring? ". Also, The sponsor, Calpis, which had been satisfied with the Tokyo movie, expressed its dissatisfaction.

This evaluation led to a meeting with Jansson, and as a result, a few elements, such as character design, were returned to a status similar to Tokyomovie, provided that it would be broadcast only in Japan.

The program was ended after well over 60 episodes.

Reception

Critical response 
Tove Jansson had difficulty viewing all of its animations due to historical issues. So, having watched only the episode 5, which had just been completed at the time, we explained the following.

Jansson also included the following other requests in her letter.

 Automobiles should not be used.
 I think the interior of the house where Moomin lives should also be changed. The rooms are too large and too empty. So, at first glance, it looks like an office.
 Moominmamma always carries a handbag.
Moominpappa usually carries a walking stick.
Non-non wears a ring on her left ankle. She also does not wear a ribbon on her head. Her hair should not be too thick.
One thing to note in particular is that the Moomin family does not have mouths. I understand that in the case of animation, a mouth is necessary, but please think about and use as small a mouth as possible to indicate who is speaking now.

However, Jansson did not dismiss all of the work, praising the colors used in the background as "The effects of colors such as water and sky are well done. Also, She stated in 1971, "At first, they told that I was angry that the Japanese Moomins were different, and in a way this is true. I have not yet had a good look at them in Japan, As far as the films sent to me, the Japanese Moomins are aggressive. besides, the Japanese Moomins have problems with cars and money, but my Moomin Valley has no such problems. but, I began to think it would be nice to have a Moomin with a Japanese flavor.".

In 2008, Masaaki Osumi saied to one of Jansson's reviews by stating.

Cast 
 Kyoko Kishida as Moomintroll
 Akiko Takamura as Moominmamma
 Hitoshi Takagi as Moominpappa
 Reiko Mutō as Snork Maiden
 Kosei Tomita as Sniff
 Junko Hori as Little My
 Masashi Amenomori as Hemulen
 Joji Yanami as The Muskrat
 Hiroyuki Nishimoto as Snufkin
 Chikao Ohtsuka as Stinky

Episodes

Home media 
In 1989, The series saw VHS and Laser Disc releases in Japan. This is the only home media.

LD
Vol.1-7 (episode 1-26)

VHS
"The volume of love" (episode 37, 49)
"The volume of dream" (episode 34, 64)

See also 
New Moomin

References

External links

1969 anime television series debuts
1970 Japanese television series endings
Fuji TV original programming
Moomin television series
Television shows based on children's books
TMS Entertainment
World Masterpiece Theater series